Jay Peak is a mountain located about  south of the Canada–US border, in Jay and Westfield, Orleans County, Vermont, of which it is the highest point. Most of the mountain is in Jay State Forest. The mountain is named for the town of Jay, Vermont, in which much of the mountain except the peak area itself is located.

The town of Jay is in turn named for John Jay, the first Chief Justice of the United States and a local landholder. Jay Peak is part of the northern Green Mountains. The mountain is flanked to the southwest by Big Jay, and to the north by North Jay Peak (3,438 ft / 1,048 m).

The mountain is in the watershed of the Missisquoi River, which drains into Lake Champlain, thence into Canada's Richelieu River, the Saint Lawrence River, and finally into the Gulf of Saint Lawrence. The south side of the mountain drains into Jay Brook, thence west into the Trout River and the Missisquoi River. The northwest side of the mountain drains into Black Falls Brook, and thence into the Trout River. The north and northeast sides of the mountain drain east into the Jay Branch of the Missisquoi River.

Jay Peak is the northernmost major mountain crossed by the Long Trail, a 272-mile (438-km) hiking trail running the length of Vermont. The Jay Peak Resort is on the mountain's northeast side.

History
On November 10, 1943, a Royal Canadian Air Force training plane crashed into the west side of the mountain near the top during a blinding snowfall killing one crew member.

In the mid 1950s brothers Ernest W. Gilpin and Wallace H. Gilpin, both state legislators and newspaper men, began and achieved their campaign to construct a highway over the south flank of Jay Peak, to connect Troy to Montgomery, Vermont. The Starr family of Troy donated portions of land for the right-of-way for the Vermont Route 242 construction.

The peaks across the highway to the south are named for the brothers Gilpin, "Gilpin Mountain", a stone monument, was dedicated to them and sits at the main entrance to Jay Peak Resort at the highway.

See also
 List of mountains in Vermont
 New England Fifty Finest
 New England Hundred Highest
 Jay Peak Resort

References

External links
 

Mountains of Vermont
Jay, Vermont
New England Hundred Highest
Landforms of Orleans County, Vermont